Han Myung-hee (born 24 April 1970) is a South Korean biathlete. He competed in the men's 20 km individual event at the 1992 Winter Olympics.

References

1970 births
Living people
South Korean male biathletes
Olympic biathletes of South Korea
Biathletes at the 1992 Winter Olympics
Place of birth missing (living people)